Zoltán Lajos Bay (July 24, 1900 in Gyulavári – October 4, 1992 in Washington, D.C.) was a Hungarian physicist, professor, and engineer who developed technologies, including tungsten lamps and
microwave devices.  He was the leader of the second group to observe radar echoes from the Moon (Moonbounce). From 1930, he worked at the University of Szeged as a professor of theoretical physics.

In 1923 at Tungsram Ltd., a research laboratory was established for improving light sources, mainly electric bulbs. The head of that laboratory was Ignác Pfeifer, whose research staff included Zoltán Bay, along with Tivadar Millner, Imre Bródy, György Szigeti, Ernő Winter, and many others.

György Szigeti worked together with Zoltán Bay on metal-vapor lamps and fluorescent light sources. They received a U.S. patent on "Electroluminescent light sources" which were made of silicon carbide; these light sources were the ancestors of light-emitting diodes (LEDs).

In 1955, Zoltán Bay became head of the Department of Nuclear Physics in the National Bureau of Standards (NBS, called today NIST), where he measured the velocity and frequency of light by a previously unknown measurement method.  As a result of Bay's research, the 1983 conference of the International Weights and Measures Bureau accepted, as a standard, the definition of a meter (metre) as recommended by Zoltán Bay.

In 1998, the State of Israel recognized him as among the Righteous Among the Nations and listed his name at Yad Vashem as rescuer number 6497.
A relative with the same name invented Bay radial speaker:BayZ

Notes

Further reading
Nagy Ferenc 1993: Bay Zoltán pályája és példája dokumentumokban. Gyűjt., vál., szerk. Nagy Ferenc. Budapest: Better - OMIKK - Püski, 1993. Page 135.

External links
 KFKI notes on Zoltan Bay
 HPO-Hungary on Zoltan Bay
 BzLogi-Hungary-Bzaka on Zoltan Bay
 Zoltan Bay Foundation for Applied Research
 http://hackaday.com/2013/11/19/retrotechtacular-zoltan-bays-moon-bounce-coulometer-signal-amplifier/
 https://link.springer.com/article/10.1007%2FBF03161123
 http://soldersmoke.blogspot.hu/2013/11/zoltan-bay-and-his-chemical-moonbounce.html
 https://history.nasa.gov/SP-4218/ch1.htm

1900 births
1992 deaths
People from Gyula
Hungarian emigrants to the United States
Hungarian inventors
Hungarian nuclear physicists
Hungarian Righteous Among the Nations
Members of the Hungarian Academy of Sciences
Academic staff of the University of Szeged
George Washington University faculty
Fellows of the American Physical Society